The 2002 Carolina Dodge Dealers 400 was the fifth stock car race of the 2002 NASCAR Winston Cup Series and the 46th iteration of the event. The race was held on Sunday, March 17, 2002, in Darlington, South Carolina, at Darlington Raceway, a  permanent egg-shaped oval racetrack. The race took the scheduled 293 laps to complete. At race's end, Sterling Marlin, driving for Chip Ganassi Racing, would come back from the back of the pack near the end of the race to win his 10th career NASCAR Winston Cup Series win and his first of the season. To fill out the podium, Elliott Sadler of Wood Brothers Racing and Kevin Harvick of Richard Childress Racing would finish second and third, respectively.

Background 

Darlington Raceway is a race track built for NASCAR racing located near Darlington, South Carolina. It is nicknamed "The Lady in Black" and "The Track Too Tough to Tame" by many NASCAR fans and drivers and advertised as "A NASCAR Tradition." It is of a unique, somewhat egg-shaped design, an oval with the ends of very different configurations, a condition which supposedly arose from the proximity of one end of the track to a minnow pond the owner refused to relocate. This situation makes it very challenging for the crews to set up their cars' handling in a way that is effective at both ends.

Entry list 

 (R) denotes rookie driver.

Practice

First practice 
The first practice session was held on Friday, March 15, at 10:20 AM EST, and would last for two hours.

Second practice 
The second practice session was held on Saturday, March 16, at 9:30 AM EST, and would last for 45 minutes.

Third and final practice 
The third and final practice session, sometimes referred to as Happy Hour, was held on Saturday, March 16, at 11:15 AM EST, and would last for 45 minutes.

Qualifying 
Qualifying was held on Friday, March 15, at 2:05 PM EST. Each driver would have two laps to set a fastest time; the fastest of the two would count as their official qualifying lap. Positions 1-36 would be decided on time, while positions 37-43 would be based on provisionals. Six spots are awarded by the use of provisionals based on owner's points. The seventh is awarded to a past champion who has not otherwise qualified for the race. If no past champ needs the provisional, the next team in the owner points will be awarded a provisional.

No drivers would fail to qualify.

Full qualifying results

Race results

References 

2002 NASCAR Winston Cup Series
NASCAR races at Darlington Raceway
March 2002 sports events in the United States
2002 in sports in South Carolina